Kevin Patrick Brady (born April 11, 1955) is an American politician who served as the U.S. representative for  from 1997 to 2023. He is a member of the Republican Party. The district includes northern Houston, including The Woodlands. He retired after the 2022 election cycle.

Early life, education, and early political career
Brady was born in Vermillion, South Dakota, one of five children of William F. and Nancy A. Brady. His father, a lawyer, was killed in 1967 in a courtroom shooting in Rapid City when Brady was 12 and his mother was in her early 30s. He graduated from Central High School in 1973. Brady has a degree in mass communications from the University of South Dakota in Vermillion.

Brady worked for the Rapid City area Chamber of Commerce. He was elected to the Rapid City common council at age 26. In 1982, he moved to Texas to work for the Beaumont, Texas Chamber of Commerce. In 1985, he went to work for the South Montgomery County Woodlands Chamber of Commerce.

Texas House of Representatives
In 1990, Brady was elected to the Texas House of Representatives, district 15, representing The Woodlands, parts of Montgomery County, and five other counties west and north of Houston.

U.S. House of Representatives

Elections

1996 
Incumbent U.S. Representative Jack Fields of Texas's 8th congressional district decided to retire. Brady ran for the seat and ranked second in the Republican primary with 22% of the vote in a six-candidate field. The candidate who ranked first, Gene Fontenot, received 36% of the vote, short of the 50% threshold. In the runoff election, Brady defeated him, 53%–47%. But the Supreme Court of the United States ruled in Bush v. Vera that three of Texas's congressional districts were unconstitutional. After hearings, the court concluded that there was no longer time to hold primaries and instead forced all candidates (Democrats and Republicans) be listed together on the November general election ballot in a jungle primary. If no candidate reached 50%, a special runoff would be held on December 10 between the two highest-ranking candidates. In the November election, Brady ranked first with 41% of the vote. In the December runoff, he defeated Fontenot again, 59%–41%.

1998–2008 
During this period, Brady never received less than 67% of the vote.

2010 

For the first time since 1998, Brady was challenged in the Republican primary. Three candidates filed against him. He defeated all of them in the March primary with 79% of the vote. He was reelected with 80% of the vote.

2012 

In the May Republican primary, in a newly redrawn district, he defeated his challenger with 76% of the vote. In the November 6 general election, he defeated the Democratic nominee with over 77% of the vote.

2014 
Brady won the March 4 Republican primary with 41,549 votes (68%) to Craig McMichael's 19,508 (32%).

In the November 4 general election, Brady was reelected with 124,897 votes (89.32%) to Democratic nominee Ken Petty's 14,930 (10.67%).

2016 
In November 2015, Steve Toth, a former state representative from The Woodlands, Texas, announced that he would run against Brady.

Brady eked out a victory in the March 1 primary with 53% of the vote, his lowest total in his 18-year career. He spent over $1.5 million to Toth's $89,325. Toth criticized Brady for compromising too often with President Obama, for supporting the omnibus federal budget bill, and for voting to revive the U.S. Export-Import Bank.

2018 

Brady won the Republican primary unopposed, as did the Democratic nominee, Steven David. Brady won the general election with 198,241 votes (73.5%) to David's 67,027 (24.8%). Libertarian Chris Duncan received 4,597 votes. As of September 30, 2018, Brady had outraised David in contributions, $4,899,672 to $31,664.

2020 

Brady defeated Kirk Osborn in the Republican primary, 80.73% to 16.19%. In the general election, he defeated Democratic nominee Elizabeth Hernandez and Libertarian challenger Chris Duncan with 72.5% of the vote to the challengers' 27.5%. The 2020 election was Brady's last election for Congress.

Tenure
In 2002, Brady voted for the Authorization for the Use of Military Force Against Iraq, authorizing the U.S. invasion of Iraq the next year. Yet in 2008 he was one of the 24 Republicans (and 227 Democrats) to vote to impeach President George W. Bush for misleading the United States into going to war in Iraq.In 2005, Brady was a chief supporter of the Dominican Republic-Central America Free Trade Agreement (DR-CAFTA), working with the Bush administration to secure passage of that free-trade agreement. In 2011, Brady also voted for free-trade agreements with South Korea Colombia, and Panama. But in 2017, Brady supported President Donald Trump's proposed border adjustment tax, arguing that the tax on imports would place the U.S. on a level playing field with other countries that have the tax and raise an estimated $1 trillion.

Brady is known as the author of a federal "sunset law" that would require every federal program not specifically written into the Constitution to justify its existence to taxpayers within 12 years or face elimination.

In March 2012, Brady proposed the Sound Dollar Act, legislation to require the Federal Reserve to monitor gold and the foreign-exchange value of the U.S. dollar. The bill would also repeal the Federal Reserve's dual mandate (controlling unemployment and inflation) and replace it with a single mandate for U.S. dollar price stability.

In November 2015, Brady was elected the 65th chair of the Committee on Ways and Means, serving until 2019.

In March 2017, Brady introduced an amendment to the American Health Care Act (the House Republican proposal to repeal the Affordable Care Act) that would allow health insurance providers to fully deduct all forms of compensation to their most highly compensated executives without limit, repealing the current law, which capped the deduction at $500,000 per executive. Los Angeles Times columnist Michael Hiltzik criticized Brady's amendment as a "secret payoff" to the health insurance industry because of its cryptic language.

As chair of the House Committee on Ways and Means, Brady opposed a resolution to request ten years' worth of returns from Trump and his business entities. In 2017, he said the resolution was an abuse done for "obvious political purposes". In September 2020, after The New York Times published an extensive report on Trump's tax records and business dealings spanning two decades, Brady called for an investigation into the Times and the report's sources.

In November 2017, Brady said that the Tax Cuts and Jobs Act of 2017 would provide "tax relief at every level"; in fact, 7% of households in 2018 would pay more in taxes and by 2022, one quarter of households would pay more. Brady's claim that 70% of the tax cuts in the bill would go to households making below $200,000 was found to be "misleading" by FactCheck.Org and "cherry-picked" by PolitiFact. FactCheck.org noted that "57.7 percent of the tax relief goes to those families making less than $200,000 in 2019—not the 70 percent that Brady cited for 2019. By 2027, 50 percent of tax relief as a result of business and individual income tax changes would go to those making more than $200,000 a year." The American Conservative Union gave him a 94% evaluation in 2017.

Brady and Representative Richard Neal introduced the bipartisan SECURE Act of 2019, which contained a number of provisions to expand access to retirement planning options and to encourage employers to set up retirement plans for workers. The bill, originally introduced in March 2019, was passed into law in December 2019 as part of the fiscal year 2020 federal appropriations bill.

In December 2020, Brady was one of 126 Republican members of the House of Representatives to sign an amicus brief in support of Texas v. Pennsylvania, a lawsuit filed at the United States Supreme Court contesting the results of the 2020 presidential election, in which Joe Biden defeated Trump. The Supreme Court declined to hear the case on the basis that Texas lacked standing under Article III of the Constitution to challenge the results of an election held by another state. House Speaker Nancy Pelosi issued a statement that called signing the amicus brief an act of "election subversion."

In December 2020, Brady indicated that he supported a second round of Paycheck Protection Program funds to assist small businesses suffering from the economic effects of the COVID-19 pandemic. He was a negotiator during the discussions to pass the Coronavirus Aid, Relief, and Economic Security Act.

In January 2021, after a mob of Trump supporters stormed the United States Capitol, Brady argued that those calling for Trump's impeachment or for the invocation of the 25th Amendment were themselves engaging in inflammatory language and that such calls could incite further violence.

On April 14, 2021, Brady announced that he would not run for a 14th House term and would retire in 2022.

Committee assignments
 Committee on Ways and Means
During his time in Congress, Brady chaired the Joint Economic Committee, the Ways and Means Committee, and the Joint Committee on Taxation.

Caucus memberships
 Army Caucus
 Congressional Missing and Exploited Children Caucus
 Congressional Rural Caucus
United States Congressional International Conservation Caucus
 Sportsmen's Caucus
Congressional Constitution Caucus
Congressional Western Caucus
Republican Study Committee

Political positions

Taxation
Brady believes policies enacted by the Trump administration, including the 2017 Tax Cuts and Jobs Act, helped put the U.S. economy in a robust position going into the COVID-19 pandemic.

Medicare
Brady strongly opposes Medicare for All.

Energy
In 2012, Brady voted for the Coal Miner Employment and Domestic Energy Infrastructure Protection Act, which rescinded Obama administration policies on coal mining and energy infrastructure. In January 2021, he expressed concern that the Biden administration's drilling ban Executive Order 13990 on federal leases would "kill" 120,000 Texas jobs.

LGBT rights
In 2011, Brady cosponsored legislation directing the Justice Department to continue defending the Defense of Marriage Act. He opposed Obergefell v. Hodges, the 2015 Supreme Court ruling that same-sex marriage bans are unconstitutional, citing his beliefs that marriage is "a union between one man and one woman" and that same-sex marriage law should be delegated to the states under the Tenth Amendment to the United States Constitution. In 2019, Brady voted against expressing opposition to banning service in the armed forces by openly transgender individuals, and in 2021, he voted against the Equality Act. The Human Rights Campaign gave Brady a score of 0 out of 100 for his voting record on legislation in the 116th Congress.

Personal life
Brady lives in The Woodlands, a suburb of Houston, with his wife, Cathy, and two sons.

In October 2005, Brady was arrested and charged with driving under the influence of alcohol in South Dakota. He pleaded no contest, was convicted of a misdemeanor, and fined $350. Brady issued an apology.

References

External links
 
 
 

|-

|-

|-

|-

|-

|-

1955 births
20th-century American politicians
21st-century American politicians
Living people
Members of the Texas House of Representatives
People from Vermillion, South Dakota
People from The Woodlands, Texas
Republican Party members of the United States House of Representatives from Texas
South Dakota Republicans
Texas Republicans
University of South Dakota alumni